Krzysztof Komosa (born 12 October 1983 in Warsaw) is a Polish figure skater. He is the 2002-2004 Polish national silver medalist and the 2005 Polish national bronze medalist.

Competitive highlights

 J = Junior level

External links
 

1983 births
Living people
Polish male single skaters
Figure skaters from Warsaw